Nieczuja is a Polish coat of arms that was used by many szlachta families in the Polish–Lithuanian Commonwealth.

History

Blazon
Gules, a Brunâtre stock or tree stub, with three lopped branches on the dexter, and two on the sinister (rarely reversed), all proper, debruised of a cross or sword in chief, also proper.

Out of a crest coronet, between two vols, the arms of the shield is repeated.

There is also older version of Nieczuja coat of arms. Azure, an Argent stock or tree stub, with four lopped branches on the dexter, and four on the sinister, all proper, debruised, of a cross or sword in chief, also proper.

Notable bearers
Notable bearers of this coat of arms include:

 Krzysztof Grzymułtowski (1620–1687), voivod of Poznań, diplomat and member of the Sejm
 Wespazjan Kochowski (1633–1700), historian, philosopher and baroque poet
 Walenty Łukawski (1743–1773), rotmistrz, member of Bar Confederation
 Józef Chłopicki (1771–1854), baron, General of Napoleon 
 Henryk Dembiński (1791–1864), engineer, traveler and general
 Stanisław Witkiewicz (1851–1915), painter, architect, writer and art theoretician
 Stanisław Ignacy Witkiewicz (1885–1939), painter, writer and philosopher
 Józef z Kocięcina Kocięcki
 Marek Nieczuja-Ostrowski
 Paweł Jan Kazimierz Nieczuja-Ostrowski, born into the family of Nieczuja
 Sebastian Wierzbicki, member of Polish Nobleman Federation (Zwiazek Szlachty Polskiej)

See also
 Polish heraldry
 Heraldry
 Coat of arms

External links 
  
 
 - Berkowicz Coats of Arms and others

Polish coats of arms